Tom and Catherine is an album by John Miles, released in 1999. The album is the soundtrack to a musical about the life of the novelist Catherine Cookson and her husband Tom Cookson. The musical was written by playwright Tom Kelly, who asked Miles to write music for it (they had already collaborated on Machine Gunners).

Track listing
All songs written by Kelly/Miles
"In this Life"
"I Must Leave the Tyne"
"Someone Out There"
"The Power of Drink"
"Something Special"
"The First time I Saw You"
"I Need Your Love"
"This Love"
"The First Time I Saw You" (Reprise)
"Love at the Stars of the Sea"
"Hanging on to Life"
"Believe in Dreams"
"Blessed with Peace"
"Go Back Home"
"Knight in Shining"
"I Need Your Love" (Reprise)

Personnel
John Miles - lead vocals, keyboards, guitar
Sara Murray - lead vocals

References

1999 albums
John Miles (musician) albums